Ruahine "Roni" Albert  is New Zealand anti-domestic violence activist of Ngāti Maniapoto, Ngāti Tūwharetoa and Tainui descent.

Albert was co-founder (with Ariana Simpson) of Te Whakaruruhau in Hamilton, the first Māori Women's Refuge, in 1987. Still active with Te Whakaruruhau, Albert also has had roles with Child, Youth and Family, Work and Income and Housing New Zealand.

Now a multi-site refuge,  Te Whakaruruhau operates a whānau facility which works closely with the Te Ao Marama Unit at Waikeria Prison and focuses on reintegration of offenders and reduction of reoffending.

The whānau facility was opened by MP Tariana Turia.

In 2000, Albert and national Women's Refuge head, Merepeka Raukawa-Tait clashed with Māori Affairs Minister Parekura Horomia over the perceived down-playing of domestic violence in the Māori community.

Albert was awarded the Queen's Service Medal for services to Māori and the community in the 2012 Queen's Birthday and Diamond Jubilee Honours.

References

Living people
People from Waikato
New Zealand activists
New Zealand women activists
Anti-domestic violence activists
Recipients of the Queen's Service Medal
Year of birth missing (living people)
New Zealand justices of the peace
Ngāti Tūwharetoa people
Waikato Tainui people
Ngāti Maniapoto people